Basrian is a Village of Gujrat District, in the Punjab province of Pakistan. It is part of Kharian Tehsil and is located at 32°74'0N 73°82'0E.

Basrian has many communities – Gujjar (Dehdar) is the major community second largest conunity is arain and many other castes. Basrian used to be an agricultural village, but many people have gone abroad for temporarily employment and business. Many have settled abroad in almost every country of the world. It is a fairly rich and small town nearby Dinga Kharian road.

Villages in Kharian Tehsil